Louisa Belle Howard (August 27, 1857 - November 4, 1947) was a dramatic reader and music teacher.

Early life
Louisa Belle Howard was born in Bellefonte, Pennsylvania, on August 27, 1857. She was the only daughter of Samuel Gill and Mary Spencer (1834-1906), and granddaughter of William Spencer, Emporia pioneer. 

With her parents, at the age of eight years, she moved to Emporia, Kansas, where she was placed in the model department of the State Normal School, and remained a student in that institution for ten years. 

Howard inherited from her father musical talent of a high order, and literary talent from her mother. Her musical studies have gone hand in hand with her literary work.

Career
At the age of eighteen years Belle Howard began to teach.

She gave lessons in music with her school-teaching. After seven years of successful work in the public schools of Lyon County, Kansas, in the vicinity of Emporia, Howard moved with her family to El Dorado, Kansas, teaching in the El Dorado city schools with marked success for a period of three years. 

She resigned her position in El Dorado to devote her energies exclusively to musical and literary work, and organized a prosperous music school at her home. When Garfield University was opened in Wichita, Kansas, she moved there from El Dorado for further study and development for herself and children. She obtained a position in the Wichita schools with a salary sufficient to meet all her expenses, tuition in the University and support of her family. 

Twenty-five years of Howard's life have been spent in the school-room, as student and teacher. She was connected with the Mozart Conservatory of Music and the Western School of Elocution and Oratory. She also taught at Guthrie, Oklahoma, the college at Waitsburg, Washington, and the Grandview School near Emporia.

Her entertainments were generally given in churches, and she was assisted by her daughter.

Personal life
Soon after starting a career as teacher, Belle Howard married Dr. Ervin P. Howard (died in 1917), but it was an unfortunate marriage, and after three years, she was left alone with her two infant children. Among other duties the care of an invalid mother fell to her. After years of struggles she failed in health and was forced to abandon labor of all kinds. After two years of rest she gained strength enough to take up again life's duties, and with her twelve-year-old daughter, May Belle, began to give musical and elocutionary entertainments. 

Many painful experiences came to her, accompanied by the serious and protracted illness of her mother, herself, and lastly of her son, but she persevered in the work of her life's effort and ambition. Her daughter became at the same time a violinist, elocutionist and vocalist of marked skill. 

Later in life she lived in Wichita with her daughter May Belle Howard (1879-1968) and son Guello/Guy Payne Howard. 

She died on November 11, 1947, at her home at 1425 Lawrence, Emporia, Kansas, and was buried at Maplewood Cemetery.

References

1857 births
1947 deaths
People from Bellefonte, Pennsylvania
People from Emporia, Kansas
People from El Dorado, Kansas
Educators from Pennsylvania
American women educators
Wikipedia articles incorporating text from A Woman of the Century
Elocutionists